The Conclusions of the Synod of Utrecht were the result of a 1905 synod of the Reformed Churches in the Netherlands. 

They included authoritative pronouncements on the disputed points of Infralapsarian/Supralapsarian, justification from eternity, mediate/immediate regeneration, and presumptive regeneration.

External links
The Conclusions of Utrecht (1905)
Puritanboard.com: Research into the Synod of Utrecht (1905)

1905 documents
20th-century Christian texts
History of Calvinism in the Netherlands
Reformed confessions of faith
20th-century Calvinism